The Sauber C23 was a Formula One racing car designed by Sauber for the 2004 Formula One season.

The C23 was driven by Giancarlo Fisichella, who left his previous team Jordan to join Sauber. Felipe Massa, who was a regular driver for Sauber in 2002, returned to Sauber after spending a year as a test driver for Ferrari. Neel Jani was the team's test driver.

Overview 
The car was a direct evolution of the Sauber C22. For this purpose, Ferrari's car from the previous year, the Ferrari F2003-GA, was used as a model. In terms of design, care was taken to make the car lighter and more test than last year's car. For the first time, the Sauber car was equipped with the same Ferrari engine type as Ferrari itself and not, as before, with the respective previous year's engine. The engine was designated the Petronas 04A. The fuel also came from Petronas and the car raced with Bridgestone tyres.

The Sauber C23 was unveiled on January 12 in Salzburg at Hangar-7, Red Bull's owned aircraft hangar, to mark the 10th anniversary of Red Bull's sponsorship.

Racing history
Giancarlo Fisichella scored the most championship points with 22 with a best finish of 4th place at the Canadian Grand Prix while Felipe Massa scored 12 points also with a best finish of 4th place at the Belgian Grand Prix. The team scored 34 points overall and 6th place in the Constructors' Championship.

Sponsorship and livery
Sauber went into 2004 with sponsorship continuity. The livery closely resembles Sauber's previous car, the C22 with the removal of computer software company TEMENOS. The following Sauber C24 featured Credit Suisse as major sponsor.

Complete Formula One results
(key)

* Denotes Ferrari engine badged as Petronas.

References

External links

Sauber C23 Launch - Photo Gallery
Sauber C23 Technical Specs

C23
2004 Formula One season cars